The 2014 Nigeria Women Premier League began on 1 March 2014 and ended on 26 November 2014. Nasarawa Amazons were the defending champions. This will be the first time in recent times that the winner will be decided straightaway without a mini super tournament at the end of the season.

Format 
The Nigeria Women Football League board announced before the commencement of the league that there shall be no super-6 league at the end of the season. It was also said that 4 teams will be promoted from the second division to increase the number of teams to 16, implying that there will be no relegation but promotion in this new system.

Teams

Adamawa Queens Waiver request 
After playing 10 games (in week 14), Adamawa Queens requested a waiver because other teams are refusing to visit their home-ground because of fear of Boko Haram. The board accepted the waiver and tagged all her matches null and void thereby updating the table. Adamawa Queens will return next season when the insurgency and state of emergency has relapsed.

League table

Statistics 
 Top scorer Amarachi Orjinma (Pelican Stars)
 Total goals scored 252 goals (193 home team and 59 for away team)
 Most clean sheets Pelican Stars (9 games)
 Highest number of away wins Rivers Angels and Pelican Stars (2)
 Most prolific team at home – Confluence Queens (25 goals)
 Most prolific team away – Rivers Angels (10 goals)
 Worst defence - Edo Queens ( 31 goals conceded)
 Highest scoring side- Rivers Angels (32 goals)
 Number of away wins 8

References 

Nigeria Women Premier League seasons
Wom
Wom
N
N